John Giles Upton Daniels (born 25 January 1942) is a former English cricketer.  Daniels was a right-handed batsman.  He was born in Birmingham, Warwickshire and educated at Winchester College, where he represented the college cricket team.

Daniels entered the Royal Armoured Corps with the rank of second lieutenant in 1961. He later made his only first-class cricket appearance for Gloucestershire against Oxford University in 1964.  In this match, he scored 15 runs in Gloucestershire's first-innings, before being dismissed by Ted Fillary, while in their second-innings he was dismissed for 4 runs by Tim Razzall. In 1964, he made a single first-class appearance for the Combined Services against Oxford University. He scored 10 runs in the Combined Services first-innings, before being dismissed by John Martin, while in their second-innings he was dismissed for 22 runs by Tim Razzall. Daniels held the rank of lieutenant still within the Royal Armoured Corps by 1965, however on 15 April 1967 he resigned his commission.

His brother, Rupert, played first-class cricket for Oxford University.  As of 2011, Daniels and his brother run a company called Edgbarne Trust Limited, based in Cheltenham, Gloucestershire.

References

External links
John Daniels at ESPNcricinfo

1942 births
Living people
Cricketers from Birmingham, West Midlands
People educated at Winchester College
Royal Armoured Corps officers
English cricketers
Gloucestershire cricketers
Combined Services cricketers
English cricketers of 1946 to 1968
20th-century British Army personnel
Military personnel from Birmingham, West Midlands
Military personnel from Warwickshire